Michael Marshall (September 13, 1944 – June 2, 2005) was a French American actor.

Early life and career
Marshall was born in Cedars-Sinai Medical Center, a hospital in Hollywood, on September 13, 1944. When his parents divorced, his father made sure that he received an American education.  He began studying law, but dreamed of becoming an actor. He later joined his mother in Paris. Marshall began to take drama classes from Raymond Griard and later directed his first film, Potato, in France under the direction of Robert Thomas, adapted from the play's eponymous Marcel Achard. He had already appeared in two films from overseas, the first was directed by his father, and the second by Vincente Minnelli. Gérard Oury, Marshall's step-father, offered him a role of a young Canadian airman in La Grande Vadrouille, as a doctor in Le Coup du parapluie. Marshall had a long, low-key career as a character actor in French cinema. On stage he starred in Croque-monsieur, Le Vallon, and Point de feu sans fumée. Marshall has also appeared in several television series.

Personal life and death
He was the only child of American actor-director William Marshall and French actress Michèle Morgan and was the stepson of Gérard Oury as well as half-brother to Tonie Marshall. Marshall fathered six children. He died in Caen, France, aged 60, survived by his mother.

Filmography 

1961: The Phantom Planet (by William Marshall) - Lt. White 
1963: The Courtship of Eddie's Father (by Vincente Minnelli) - Wedding guest (uncredited)
1964: Patate (by Robert Thomas) - Jean François de Baylac 
1965: Déclic et...des claques (by Philippe Clair) - Vivi
1965: Les Deux orphelines (by Riccardo Freda) - Roger de Vaudray
1966: La Fille de la mer Morte (Fortuna) (by Menahem Golan) - Pierre
1966: Is Paris Burning? (by René Clément) - Membre F.F.I (uncredited)
1966: La Grande Vadrouille (by Gérard Oury) - Alan Mac Intosh
1967: Susanne, die Wirtin von der Lahn (by François Legrand / Franz Antel) - Anselmo, a student
1968: Death Rides Along, by Joseph Warren / Giuseppe Vari : Idaho Kent
1968: I'll Sell My Skin Dearly (Vendo cara la pelle) (by Ettore Maria Fizzarotti) - Shane
1969: Les Chemins de Katmandou (by André Cayatte) - Harold
1970: Hello-Goodbye (by Jean Negulesco) - Paul
1970: La liberté en croupe (by Édouard Molinaro) - uniquement assistant réalisateur (uncredited)
1973: Quelques messieurs trop tranquilles (by Georges Lautner) - Inspector
1973: Le Serpent (by Henri Verneuil) - (uncredited)
1973: The Day of the Jackal (by Fred Zinnemann) - Gendarme in Tulle (uncredited)
1973: Les Aventures de Rabbi Jacob (by Gérard Oury) - Rôle coupé au montage (uncredited)
1973: L'Histoire très bonne et très joyeuse de Colinot trousse-chemise (by Nina Companeez) - Le seigneur
1979: Lady Oscar (by Jacques Demy) - Nicolas de la Motte
1979: I love you, je t'aime (by George Roy Hill) - 1st Assistant Director
1979: Moonraker (by Lewis Gilbert) - Col. Scott
1979: The Hostage Tower (by Claudio Guzman) - U.S. Guard
1980: Le Coup du parapluie (by Gérard Oury) - Le docteur
1981: Une saison de paix à Paris – (Sezona mira u Parizu) (by Pregrad Golobovic)
1981: Téhéran 43, nid d'espions (by Alexandre Alov and Vladimir Naoumov) - First Terrorist
1982: La Morte Vivante (by Jean Rollin) - Greg
1983: Ça va pas être triste (by Pierre Sisser) - Le motard
1984: The Secret of the Selenites (by Jean Image) - Sirius (voice)
1984: French Lover (Until September) (by Richard Marquand) - Friend of Xavier
1985: Asterix Versus Caesar (by Paul and Gaëtan Brizzi) - (English version, voice)
1985: Maine-Océan (by Jacques Rozier) - L'Avocat 'au fond des bois'
1986: Je hais les acteurs (by Gérard Krawczyk) - J.P. Jones
1986: Asterix in Britain - (English version, voice)
1987: Club de rencontres (by Michel Lang) - Roland - l'amant d'Agnès
1987:  (by Franz Antel) - Eduard Hanslick
1987: Grand Larceny (by Jeannot Szwarc) - (uncredited)
1989: La Révolution française / Les années terribles (by Richard T. Heffron) - Un lieutenant (segment "Années Terribles, Les")
1990: Mister Frost (by Philippe Setbon) - Patrick Hollander
1991: S.A.S, l'œil de la veuve – (Eye of the widow) (by Andrew V. McLaglen) - Klaus
1994: Neuf mois (by Patrick Braoudé) - Arthur's father
2001: Fifi Martingale (by Jacques Rozier) - L'auteur
2004: L'Américain (by Patrick Timsit) - Le policier américain
2004: Les aventures extraordinaires de Michel Strogoff (by Bruno-René Huchez and Alexandre Huchez - Ivan Ogareff (voice)

French television 
1972: Meurtre par la bande (TV) episode of the TV series Les Cinq Dernières Minutes, by Claude Loursais) - L'employé des Pompes funèbres
1973: L'Alphomega (by Lazare Iglesis) 
1977: Little House on the Prairie, episode L'or ", le rôle du pasteur
1979: Les dames de la côte (by Nina Companeez)
1983: Les Enquêtes du commissaire Maigret (episode "La Tête d'un homme", by Louis Grospierre) - Le tzar Alexandre 1er
1987: Le Tiroir secret (6 episodes, by Édouard Molinaro, Nadine Trintignant, Michel Boisrond and Roger Gillioz) - Luc Jolivet
1987: Les Enquêtes du commissaire Maigret (épisode: Les Caves du Majestic ,by Maurice Frydland) - Oswald Clark / William Crosby
1991: La Grande Dune (by Bernard Stora) - Sammy
1996-1998: Les Vacances de l'amour (by Pat Le Guen-Ténot, Olivier Altman, Emmanuel Fonlladosa, reoccurring role of Capitaine Oliver) - Oliver
1997: Jamais deux sans toi...t (episode 131 de Dominique Masson: "Devine qui vient squatter") - Jean-Pierre
1997: Le grand Batre, réalisée par Laurent Carceles d'après le roman de Frédérique Hébrard, rôle de Teddy
2000: Avocats et Associés (épisode # 3.3: "Le bébé de la finale", by Denis Amar) - Dr. Meriot
2000: Commissaire Moulin (épisode "Une protection très rapprochée") - Machard

Theatre
 Croque-monsieur – directed by Jean-Pierre Grenier at the St. George Theatre
 Le Vallon – directed by Simone Benmussa at the Rennaud-Barrault Theatre
 Point de feu sans fumée – directed by Jean Paul Tribout at the Théâtre Édouard VII
 L'Homme au Parapluie – directed by Daniel Royan at the Theatre de saint Maur

References

External links
 
 Mike Marshall at Yahoo! Movies

1944 births
2005 deaths
French male film actors
American emigrants to France
Male actors from Hollywood, Los Angeles